Tom Peder Pettersson (born 25 March 1990) is a Swedish footballer who plays as a defender for Allsvenskan club Mjällby.

Career statistics

Honours

Club
FC Trollhättan
Division 1 Södra: 2008

IFK Göteborg
 Svenska Cupen: 2014–15

References

External links
 

1990 births
FC Trollhättan players
Åtvidabergs FF players
Allsvenskan players
Superettan players
Ettan Fotboll players
Oud-Heverlee Leuven players
IFK Göteborg players
Östersunds FK players
FC Cincinnati players
Lillestrøm SK players
Mjällby AIF players
Belgian Pro League players
Swedish expatriate footballers
Expatriate footballers in Belgium
Swedish expatriate sportspeople in Belgium
Expatriate footballers in Norway
Swedish expatriate sportspeople in Norway
Swedish footballers
Living people
Sweden under-21 international footballers
Sweden youth international footballers
Association football defenders
Association football midfielders
Major League Soccer players
Eliteserien players
People from Trollhättan
Sportspeople from Västra Götaland County